Aadel Bülow-Hansen (24 September 1906 – 18 November 2001) was a Norwegian physiotherapist. Together with psychiatrist Trygve Braatøy (1904-1953), she developed  psychomotor physiotherapy using psychomotorics, which can be used for the treatment of neuromuscular stress conditions.

Aadel Bülow-Hansen was born in Kristiania (now Oslo), Norway. She went to primary and middle school at Nissens Pigskole. She continued her education at Orthopedic and Medico-Mechanical Institute (Christiania Orthopediske and Medico Mekaniske Senter), which had been founded by her father, Victor Bülow-Hansen (1861–1938).

She was employed by  Sophie's Minde Clinic (now a subsidiary of Oslo University Hospital) from 1927 until 1945. During World War II, she worked together with neurologist Henrik Seyffarth, to find treatments for work-related stress. She came to understand that there might be a connection between muscle tension, respiration, and mental trauma.

She was the first physiotherapist to be named to the First Class of the Royal Norwegian Order of St. Olav, and in 2000, she was named as the physiotherapist of the century in Norway.

One of her students was Gerda Boyesen, who later developed Biodynamic Psychology, a form of Body Psychotherapy.

References

1906 births
2001 deaths
People from Oslo in health professions
Norwegian physiotherapists
Recipients of the St. Olav's Medal